Velika (Cyrillic: Велика; "great" (fem.) in South Slavic) may refer to:

Places
 Velika (bishopric), a medieval bishopric associated with Clement of Ohrid
 Velika, Bosnia and Herzegovina, a village in Derventa
 Velika Kladuša, Bosnia and Herzegovina
 Velika Sočanica, Bosnia and Herzegovina
 Velika, Bulgaria
 Velika, Croatia
 Velika Gorica, Croatia
 Velika, Larissa, a beach village in Thessaly, Greece
 Velika Hoča, Kosovo
 Velika, Montenegro, a village in Plav
 Velika Plana, Serbia
 Velika Bukovica, Slovenia
 Velika Goba, Slovenia

Other uses 
 Velika attacks (1879), in Velika, Montenegro
 Velika Begovica, 19th-century Serbian rebel
 Velika Morava, a river in Serbia

See also 
 Veliky (disambiguation)